Juan Manuel Barrero Barrero (born 27 June 1980), known as Juanma, is a Spanish retired footballer who played as a goalkeeper, and the manager of Mérida AD. 

He spent most of his 16-year professional career in the Spanish lower leagues. He appeared in 38 La Liga games over three seasons, with Atlético Madrid and Numancia.

Club career
Juanma was born in Badajoz, Extremadura. After beginning with local side Mérida UD, he moved in 2002 to Atlético Madrid, starting out at their reserves. He played twice with the first team in his first season, then 11 times in the 2003–04 campaign as all goalkeepers (himself, Germán Burgos and Sergio Aragoneses) appeared in roughly the same matches and they eventually qualified for the UEFA Intertoto Cup.

Juanma then spent two seasons with CD Numancia, starting in his first but being relegated from La Liga. He left in 2006, resuming his career in the lower leagues: Mérida again, Universidad de Las Palmas CF, CF Atlético Ciudad and AD Alcorcón.

In mid-July 2010, after helping Alcorcón promote for the first time in its history to the second division – he was also in goal for the club's historical elimination of Real Madrid in the Copa del Rey – the 30-year-old Juanma moved abroad, joining a host of compatriots at Aris Thessaloniki F.C. with whom he agreed to a two-year contract. After one unassuming season in Greece he returned to his country, signing for FC Cartagena of the second level.

Managerial career
On 28 February 2020, Juanma was appointed manager of Mérida AD in the third tier. Prior to the appointment he had already worked in the club's structure as goalkeeper coach and director of the academy.

Juanma only managed the club on two matches, as the competition was suspended due to the COVID-19 pandemic, and joined Albacete Balompié's staff in December 2020, as an assistant of Alejandro Menéndez. He left in May after Menéndez was sacked, and returned to Mérida on 16 January 2022.

References

External links

1980 births
Living people
Sportspeople from Badajoz
Spanish footballers
Footballers from Extremadura
Association football goalkeepers
La Liga players
Segunda División players
Segunda División B players
Tercera División players
Mérida UD footballers
Atlético Madrid B players
Atlético Madrid footballers
CD Numancia players
Universidad de Las Palmas CF footballers
AD Alcorcón footballers
FC Cartagena footballers
SD Ponferradina players
Extremadura UD footballers
Super League Greece players
Aris Thessaloniki F.C. players
Spanish expatriate footballers
Expatriate footballers in Greece
Spanish expatriate sportspeople in Greece
Spanish football managers
Primera Federación managers
Segunda Federación managers
Segunda División B managers